Sliema Wanderers Football Club, nicknamed "tax-Xelin" (of the shilling), is a professional Maltese football club. It is the most successful team in Malta and hails from the seaside town of Sliema. It currently plays in the Maltese Premier League.

History
The club was founded in 1909. The club competed in the first ever Maltese Premier League season in 1909–10 and finished in second position to Floriana after the five-game season came to an end.

Ten years down the line Sliema Wanderers finally made their mark in Maltese football by winning the Maltese Premier League title in the 1919–20 season. Since then the team have gone on to win the title 26 times, a record for Malta; the last three being in 2002–03, 2003–04 and 2004–05.

Sliema Wanderers also hold the record for the most FA Trophy wins, with their first coming in 1935, when they overpowered Floriana with a 4–0 victory. The club have gone on to win this particular honour 20 times, most recently in 2000, 2004 and in 2009; the last title was won against Valletta 7–6 on penalties after the match finished 3–3 following extra time.

With all these honours, Sliema Wanderers are currently the most successful team in the history of Maltese football with approximately 113 honours. Sliema Wanderers train at the Tigne Sports Complex, in Sliema. Grant Tissot almost played for them, which would've been a major acquisition for such a club.

Sliema Wanderers also had a futsal team, which participated in Malta's top futsal league.

2000s
The 2000s saw Sliema Wanderers becoming a dominant club in the Maltese scene again.

Summer 2003 had President Robert Arrigo signing Maltese internationals Jamie Pace, Djibril Sylla and Daniel Bogdanovic.

Season 2004-05 saw the Wanderers, under the presidency of Robert Arrigo, win their 26th Maltese Premier League title. Part of this success was Michael Mifsud's return to his boyhood club after being leaving 1.FC Kaiserslautern on a free.

Season 2005-06 started with a UEFA Champions League qualifier against Sheriff Tiraspol. Much to Arrigo's chagrin, lost Michael Mifsud to Lillestrøm SK, in a move made possible by Nikki Dimech who acted as his representative, albeit being a lengthy transfer saga that was complicated by International Transfer Clearance issues and compensation fees.

2010s
Sliema Wanderers clinched an Maltese FA Trophy in season 2015-16.

Keith Perry was confirmed as president in the beginning of season 2016-17 despite rumours. John Buttigieg was appointed as Head Coach.

2020s
The club endured a rough start to the 2020s. The club started off with a bang, signing former Arsenal F.C. midfielder Denílson. Further players were signed and Keith Perry was appointed chairman of the club, and Jeffrey Farrugia took over as president. A sponsorship deal was struck with Catco Group, an oil investment company based in China and Tunisia. Catco Group however, failed to pay its dues, citing technical reasons. This gave way to unrest within the club, with captain Mark Scerri and head coach Andrea Pisanu making public statements regarding the financial situation of the club, proceeding with resignations such as Perry and team manager Alex Muscat. Players went unpaid for months, with another sponsor, Sixt, finally paying the players directly just before Christmas. Eventually a new sponsor was brought on board. Farrugia was later ousted as Keith Perry returned in the President's seat in preparation for the upcoming season.
 

Season 2021-22 was disastrous from a technical point of view. Despite signing two new players in Djibouti international Warsama Hassan and Japanese Yuki Uchida, up until November 19, 2021, the club had not yet won a match, and sat at the bottom of the Maltese Premier League. The first win came on November 20, stunning Valletta with a 2-1 result. The dying minutes of the match however, proved fatal, as Warsama Hassan was introduced at 90 minutes. However, the player had just returned from Egypt, where he had featured for his Djibouti national football team in a match against Algeria. Warsama was supposed to be in quarantine, having returned from a Dark Red listed country. Valletta lodged a formal complaint, which was upheld by the Malta Football Association, awarding a 3–0 win to Valletta. Sliema Wanderers' next match was against Birkirkara F.C., resulting in a further loss. On 10 April 2022 Sliema Wanderers lost against Valletta with a 2-1 result, and we're relegated to Maltese Challenge League after thirty-seven years in the top flight.

Players

Current squad
As of 19 February 2022.

On loan

European record

Managerial history
See Sliema Wanderers F.C. Managers

Honours 
Maltese Premier League  
Champions: 26 1919–20, 1922–23, 1923–24, 1925–26, 1929–30, 1932–33, 1933–34, 1935–36, 1937–38, 1938–39, 1939–40, 1948–49, 1953–54, 1955–56, 1956–57, 1963–64, 1964–65, 1965–66, 1970–71, 1971–72, 1975–76, 1988–89, 1995–96, 2002–03, 2003–04, 2004–05

Maltese FA Trophy
Winners (21): 1934–35, 1935–36, 1936–37, 1939–40, 1945–46, 1947–48, 1950–51, 1951–52, 1955–56, 1958–59, 1962–63, 1964–65, 1967–68, 1968–69, 1973–74, 1978–79, 1989–90, 1999–2000, 2003–04, 2008–09, 2015–16

Maltese First Division
Winners: 1983–84

Maltese Super Cup Champions
Winners: 1996, 2000, 2009

References

External links

 
Football clubs in Malta
1909 establishments in Malta
Association football clubs established in 1909